"Kyoto" is a song by American singer-songwriter Phoebe Bridgers. It was released on April 9, 2020 as the second single from her second studio album, Punisher (2020). Rolling Stone, Billboard, Paste, Variety, Consequence of Sound, and The Line of Best Fit all ranked the song among the best of 2020, the latter placing the song atop its list. At the 2021 Grammy Awards, "Kyoto" was nominated for Best Rock Performance and Best Rock Song.

Background and composition
"Kyoto" has been described to be an indie rock, grunge-rock, pop rock, and garage rock song. Bridgers wrote the song about her complicated, evolving relationship with her father. Her parents divorced when she was 20, leaving Bridgers angry. The song is named for the city in Japan; Bridgers wrote the song on her first trip to the country in February 2019. A lyric observing that Japan "still" has pay phones – the sentiment being that they are long outdated – was entirely fictional, Bridgers said. In a press statement, Bridgers expounded upon the song's meaning:

Producer Tony Berg suggested she speed up the song's tempo, creating a brighter, more upbeat tone. Bridgers agreed, growing "sick" of recording slower ballads. "Kyoto" is instrumentally dense, incorporating twelve-string guitar, synthesizers, Autoharp, and mellotron. Bright Eyes' Nathaniel Walcott also contributes horns, while Jenny Lee Lindberg of Warpaint adds vocals.

A new version of the song featuring a new arrangement from composer Rob Moose was released on November 10, 2020 as the first single from Bridgers and Moose's collaborative Copycat Killer EP. Bridgers also shared an acoustic version of the song as a Spotify exclusive in March 2021, featuring guitar and backing vocals from American singer-songwriter Jackson Browne.

Music video
The song's music video was initially slated to have been filmed in Kyoto proper. Bridgers planned the shoot to take place during a trip to Japan supporting the National in March 2020, though these dates were cancelled due to the COVID-19 pandemic. Instead, the clip was recorded in front of a green screen in Los Angeles. It pictures Bridgers in a skeleton costume and superimposed over stock footage of Kyoto, including images of an arcade and at the Fushimi Inari-taisha shrine. She flies over the city and an ocean at points in the clip. The video includes appearances by Emily Bannon, Marshall Vore and Harrison Whitford—members of Bridgers' touring band. At one point in the video, the three are saved from Godzilla by Bridgers, who shoots lasers from her eyes. The video was directed and edited by Nina Ljeti.

Live performances
In promotion of the single, Bridgers played the song on Jimmy Kimmel Live! remotely from a bathtub in her home while playing a Suzuki QChord and singing into a toy microphone. Bridgers did another remote performance of the song on The Late Show with Stephen Colbert on July 20, 2020. On September 12, 2020 Bridgers performed the song on CBS This Morning alongside other Punisher tracks. She performed the song again on The Late Late Show with James Corden on December 16, 2020, this time while lying down in bed and looking at her phone before walking over to perform at a green screen-ed Carnegie Hall. She performed the song on her Saturday Night Live debut on February 6, 2021.

Accolades

Personnel 
 Tony Berg – electric guitar, autoharp
 Phoebe Bridgers – baritone electric guitar, rubber-bridge guitar, electric guitar, lead vocals
 Ethan Gruska – synthesizers, electric guitar, Mellotron
 Jenny Lee Lindberg – bass
 Joseph Lorge – electric guitar
 Marshall Vore – drums, percussion
 Nathaniel Walcott – horns
 Harrison Whitford – electric guitar, 12-string acoustic guitar, 12-string electric guitar, high strung acoustic guitar

Charts

Weekly charts

Year-end charts

References

External links
 

2020 singles
2020 songs
Phoebe Bridgers songs
Songs written by Phoebe Bridgers
Dead Oceans singles
Songs about Japan